Basque is an unincorporated community in Malheur County, Oregon, United States. It lies along U.S. Route 95 about halfway between Burns Junction and McDermitt. Basque migrants, many of them sheepherders, settled in remote parts of southeastern Oregon between the 1880s and the 1930s.

References

Basque-American culture in Oregon
Unincorporated communities in Malheur County, Oregon
Unincorporated communities in Oregon